The 2021–22 Brisbane Heat Women's season was the seventh in the team's history. Coached by Ashley Noffke and captained by Jess Jonassen, the Heat were scheduled to play four of 14 regular season WBBL07 games at Great Barrier Reef Arena in Mackay—the only fixtures in their home state of Queensland for the tournament due to construction work taking place at regular primary ground Allan Border Field. They finished in third place on the ladder, resulting in their fourth consecutive finals series appearance. However, for the second year in a row, the Heat were eliminated by a lower-ranked opponent in their first match of the knockout stage—this time suffering a "crushing" eight-wicket defeat at the hands of the Adelaide Strikers.

Squad 
Each 2021–22 squad is made up of 15 active players. Teams could sign up to five 'marquee players', with a maximum of three of those from overseas. Marquees were classed as any overseas player, or a local player who holds a Cricket Australia national contract at the start of the WBBL|07 signing period.

Personnel changes made ahead of the season included:

 New Zealand marquees Amelia Kerr and Maddy Green did not re-sign with the Heat.
 South African marquee Anneke Bosch and Indian marquee Poonam Yadav signed with the Heat, marking their first appearances in the league.
 Delissa Kimmince departed the Heat, retiring from cricket after WBBL|06.
 Lilly Mills departed the Heat, signing with the Perth Scorchers.

The table below lists the Heat players and their key stats (including runs scored, batting strike rate, wickets taken, economy rate, catches and stumpings) for the season.

Ladder

Fixtures 

All times are local

Regular season

Eliminator

Statistics and awards 
 Most runs: Georgia Redmayne – 437 (5th in the league)
Highest score in an innings: Grace Harris – 75 (51) vs Hobart Hurricanes, 30 October 2021
Most wickets: Jess Jonassen – 21 (2nd in the league)
Best bowling figures in an innings: Jess Jonassen – 3/10 (3.1 overs) vs Melbourne Renegades, 20 November 2021
Most catches (fielder): Grace Harris – 10 (equal 2nd in the league)
Player of the Match awards:
Georgia Redmayne – 3
Grace Harris – 2
Courtney Sippel – 1
WBBL|07 Player of the Tournament: Grace Harris (4th), Georgia Redmayne (equal 5th)
 WBBL|07 Team of the Tournament: Georgia Redmayne, Grace Harris, Jess Jonassen
 Heat Most Player Valuable Player: Grace Harris

References 

2021–22 Women's Big Bash League season by team
Brisbane Heat (WBBL)